Mausoom Abdul Ghafoor (born 20 March 1976) is a Maldivian footballer who is well known by his nickname "Maasey". He plays at Hurriyya as a forward.

International career
Mausoom has appeared in FIFA World Cup qualifying matches for the Maldives.

References

External links 

Mausoom Abdul Ghafoor at 11v11.com

1976 births
Living people
Maldivian footballers
Maldives international footballers
New Radiant S.C. players
Association football forwards